The 1980 Dora Mavor Moore Awards were the first major award ceremony celebrating excellence in theatre from the Toronto Alliance for the Performing Arts.

Winners and nominees

General Theatre Division

Musical Theatre or Revue Division

See also
34th Tony Awards
1980 Laurence Olivier Awards

References

1980 in Toronto
Dora Awards, 1980
Dora Mavor Moore Awards ceremonies